Jellinbah may refer to:

 Jellinbah, Queensland, a locality in the Central Highlands Region, Queensland, Australia
Jellinbah coal mine, a mine in Jellinbah, Central Highlands Region, Queensland, Australia